La Dama de Beirut is a 1965 Italian film directed by Ladislao Vajda.

Cast

External links
 

1965 films
Italian musical drama films
1960s Italian-language films
1960s Italian films
Spanish musical drama films
1960s Spanish-language films
1960s Spanish films
Spanish multilingual films
Italian multilingual films